Boone Logan (born August 13, 1984) is an American former professional baseball relief pitcher. He played in Major League Baseball (MLB) for the Chicago White Sox, Atlanta Braves, New York Yankees, Colorado Rockies, Cleveland Indians, and Milwaukee Brewers from 2006 to 2018.

Early life
Logan grew up in Helotes, Texas and attended Sandra Day O'Connor High School in Helotes, Texas. He attended and pitched for Temple College in Temple, Texas, in 2003.

Playing career

Chicago White Sox
The Chicago White Sox selected Logan in the 20th round (600th overall) of the 2002 Major League Baseball draft. Logan made his Major League debut on April 4, 2006 against the Cleveland Indians. During 2006, Logan made 21 relief appearances with one save despite splitting his time in the Minors but accumulated an 8.31 ERA in the Majors that year.

In 2007, Logan made 68 relief appearances, and was 2–1 with a 4.97 ERA. In 2008, he made 55 appearances, going 2–3 with a 5.95 ERA.

Atlanta Braves
On December 4, 2008, Logan was traded, along with Javier Vázquez, to the Atlanta Braves for minor league catcher Tyler Flowers, shortstop Brent Lillibridge, third baseman Jon Gilmore and pitcher Santos Rodriguez.

During the 2009 season, Logan made 20 relief appearances, going 1–1 with a 5.19 ERA.

New York Yankees
On December 22, 2009, Logan was once again traded along with Javier Vázquez, this time to the New York Yankees for Melky Cabrera, and prospects Michael Dunn and Arodys Vizcaíno. On April 16, 2010, Logan was called up by the Yankees to replace Chan Ho Park in the Yankee bullpen. In 2010, Logan made 51 relief appearances, going 2–0 with a 2.93 ERA.

In 2011, he made 64 relief appearances going 5–3 with a 3.46 ERA. Logan made an MLB-leading 80 relief appearances in 2012, going 7–2 with one save and a 3.74 ERA.

In 2013, he made 61 appearances from the bullpen, going 5–2 with a 3.23 ERA. On October 4, 2013, Logan underwent surgery in his left elbow to remove a bone spur. He became a free agent at the end of the season.

Colorado Rockies
Logan signed a three-year, $16.5 million deal with the Colorado Rockies on December 16, 2013.

On September 12, 2014, Logan again underwent surgery in his left elbow to remove a bone spur, abruptly ending his 2014 season. In 35 games, Logan went 2–3 with a 6.84 ERA.

Logan pitched in 60 games for the Rockies the following season, going 0–3 with a 4.33 ERA. In 2016, he went 2–5 with a 3.69 ERA.

Cleveland Indians
On February 7, 2017, Logan signed with the Cleveland Indians to a one-year contract with an option for the 2018 season. In 38 games with Cleveland, he was 1–0 with a 4.71 ERA.

The Indians declined to exercise their club option on Logan's contract for the 2018 season on November 6, 2017, making Logan a free agent.

Milwaukee Brewers
On January 10, 2018, Logan signed a one-year deal with the Milwaukee Brewers worth $1.875 million. On June 19, Logan was designated for assignment and was released on June 24.

Pitching style
Logan threw with a sidearm delivery, making him appealing as a left-handed specialist. Left-handed hitters batted only .238 against him in his career, while righties hit .291. Logan was especially tough against lefties because his primary pitch was a slider in the low 80s that breaks sharply away from them. This was his favorite pitch to throw in two-strike counts. He also had a four-seam fastball and two-seam fastball that appeared in the 92-95 mph range. Logan also threw a high-80s changeup from time to time against right-handers.

References

External links

1984 births
Living people
Baseball players from San Antonio
Major League Baseball pitchers
Chicago White Sox players
Atlanta Braves players
New York Yankees players
Colorado Rockies players
Cleveland Indians players
Milwaukee Brewers players
Great Falls White Sox players
Winston-Salem Warthogs players
Charlotte Knights players
Gwinnett Braves players
Tiburones de La Guaira players
American expatriate baseball players in Venezuela
Scranton/Wilkes-Barre Yankees players
Colorado Springs Sky Sox players
Albuquerque Isotopes players
Biloxi Shuckers players